Centre de services scolaire de Saint-Hyacinthe is a French-language, school service centre operating in the region of Monteregie in Quebec, Canada.

Elementary schools 
 École Assomption 
 École Plein-Soleil 
 École au Coeur-des-Monts 
 École Roger-LaBrèque 
 École aux Quatre-Vents 
 École Roméo-Forbes 
 École Bois-Joli - Sacré-Coeur 
 École Saint-André 
 École de la Croisée 
 École Sacré-Coeur 
 École de la Rocade 
 École Saint-Charles-Garnier 
 École des Moissons 
 École Saint-Damase 
 École Douville 
 École Saint-Hugues - Saint-Marcel 
 École Henri-Bachand 
 École Saint-Jean-Baptiste 
 École La Présentation 
 École Saint-Joseph - Spénard 
 École Lafontaine 
 École Saint-Nazaire 
 École Larocque 
 École Saint-Pierre 
 École Maurice-Jodoin 
 École Saint-Sacrement 
 École Notre-Dame-de-la-Paix 
 École Saint-Thomas-d'Aquin 
 École Notre-Dame 
 École Sainte-Rosalie

Secondary schools 
 École secondaire Casavant
 École secondaire Fadette
 Polyvalente Hyacinthe-Delorme
 Polyvalente Robert-Ouimet
 École Raymond

Others 
École René-Saint-Pierre

École professionnelle de Saint-Hyacinthe

Centre de formation des Maskoutains

References

External links 
 School Board Website (French)

Education in Montérégie
School districts in Quebec